is a Japanese supermarket chain in America, with locations in California, Illinois, Texas, Hawaii, and New Jersey.

History
As a subsidiary of Yaohan,  Yaohan USA opened its first supermarket in Fresno in 1979. During its heyday, Yaohan operated eight stores all over the States, as well as four Daikichi sushi shops. 

Upon bankruptcy of Yaohan in 1997, Yaohan USA was subject to a management buyout by regional management, with rebranding as Mitsuwa Marketplace. 

Mitsuwa continued to expand its stores, mainly inside California. In December 2012, a Japanese trading company, acquired Mitsuwa's stock.

Store locations

California

Mitsuwa has seven stores in four metropolitan areas in California:

San Francisco Bay Area
San Jose

Los Angeles area
Torrance 
San Gabriel 
West Los Angeles

Orange County area
Costa Mesa
Irvine

San Diego area
San Diego

The Los Angeles location of Mitsuwa Marketplace in the Little Tokyo neighborhood closed in 2009. In 2019, Torrance closed their previous location in the Old Town Torrance. The new Torrance location within the Del Amo Fashion Center opened in February 2020.

Hawaii 
Honolulu area
Honolulu
The second-floor Honolulu store is located in the International Market Place in Waikiki, Honolulu.

Texas 
Dallas/Fort Worth area
Plano 
Mitsuwa entered the Dallas/Fort Worth area with a store in Plano, an upper-middle-class northern suburb of Dallas. The store, which opened in the spring of 2017, is near North Central Expressway and Legacy Drive.

Chicago metropolitan area 

The Chicago area store is at 100 E. Algonquin Road in Arlington Heights, Illinois — part of a number of Japanese businesses in Arlington Heights — and opened in 1991. The store is open 365 days a year from 9 am to 9 pm. Mitsuwa is the largest Japanese marketplace in the Midwestern US. The Chicago store is one of three that are east of the Rockies. This Mitsuwa location, like those in other states, was formerly known as Yaohan.

The food court has many traditional foods, such as sushi, tempura, noodles, etc. It is made of the Otafuku-tei (now replaced by Gabutto Burger), Kayaba, Santouka Ramen, Releaf Matcha, Jockey Express, Daikichi Sushi, Pastry House Hippo, and Mama House restaurants. Mitsuwa hosts the JTB travel agency. There are two entertainment shops in Mitsuwa Chicago, JBC Video, a Japanese video rental store, and Kinokuniya, a Japanese book shop that sells stationery, novels, manga, and other imported media. A cell phone store, Galaxy Wireless, is at the Chicago Mitsuwa.

Mitsuwa Chicago had a china store called 'Utsuwa no Yakata'. This store closed on April 1, 2006. Kinokuniya bookstore, which had expanded into the area previously owned by a China store, has been replaced by SanSeiDo.

The location has two personal care shops, Shiseido, a Japanese cosmetics store, and Super Health, a vitamin and other health supplement store.

New Jersey 

The Edgewater, New Jersey store is located on 595 River Road. It has a food court, a bookstore owned by Kinokuniya, a gift shop selling Bape clothing and golf clubs, a video store that carries DVDs and Laserdiscs of movies and a store selling Japanese ceramics and denki-gama, making Mitsuwa more of a mini-mall than a traditional supermarket. It is a small taste of what current Japanese multi-story malls, or subway stations, are like.

The supermarket section sells fresh produce and certified Angus beef, as well as Japanese drinks and snacks such as Yakult, Calpis, Ramune, Ikechi Shrimp Chips, Pocari Sweat, Pocky, Pretz, and Japanese liquor such as Sake and Shōchū.

The Books Kinokuniya bookstore section sells Japanese music CDs, novels, job applications, children's books, manga, and imported magazines (including dozens of Japanese fashion magazines) such as Weekly Shonen Jump and Disney Fan.

There is also a kiosk that sells Ito En tea and Minamoto Kitchoan that sells Japanese sweets such as manju, mochi, and Inja.

A Daiso "100-yen shop" location opened at the marketplace in August 2019.

The New Jersey location used to run an exclusive shuttle bus between the store and the Port Authority Bus Terminal in New York City. The bus transported Mitsuwa customers for a nominal fee and it did not make any stops along its route. The service was terminated on December 31, 2014.

See also
 99 Ranch Market
 H Mart
 Marukai Corporation U.S.A.
 Nijiya Market

References

External links

Official Mitsuwa Marketplace Site
Mitsuwa Marketplace – NJ Store (in Japanese Language) (Archive)

Supermarkets of the United States
Companies based in Los Angeles County, California
Restaurants in Illinois
Japanese-American culture in California
Japanese supermarkets
Restaurants established in 1972
1972 establishments in California